New Atlantic were an early 1990s British electronic dance music duo from Southport, Merseyside. They were made up of Richard Lloyd and Cameron Saunders, and best known for their UK #12 hit "I Know" in March 1992. The CD single of "I Know" contained an alternate mix, which was performed by the group onstage on the UK television programme, The Hitman and Her. New Atlantic were signed to Liverpool's 3 Beat Records, which in turn signed the track to Pete Waterman's PWL Records; a remix was done by Love Decade, which became the most recognizable version. "I Know" also crossed over to the United States, where it reached number 15 on Billboards Hot Dance Club Play chart in June 1992, where it was released on Tommy Boy Records. "I Know" would later be sampled by Chase & Status on their 2013 single "Count on Me".

New Atlantic also produced Berri's top 5 UK hit, a dance cover of Elkie Brooks' "Sunshine After the Rain".  New Atlantic released a number of other records (including the UK #70 chart hit "Into the Future") and an album.

Saunders is now part of the DJ production duo the Young Punx.

References

English electronic music duos
English dance music groups
Electronic dance music duos
Male musical duos
Musical groups from Merseyside